David Roger Brierley (2 June 1935 – 23 September 2005) was an English actor.

Career
Brierley appeared in dozens of television productions over a forty-year period. He twice appeared in Doctor Who, as Trevor in The Daleks' Master Plan (1965) and as the voice of Drathro in The Mysterious Planet (1986). Brierley appeared as Mr Thoneycroft in episode 6 of The Fall and Rise of Reginald Perrin (1976), in the biopic Jinnah based on the life of Muhammad Ali Jinnah, in the Granada television series Jeeves and Wooster as Sir Roderick Glossop and as Michael Palin's latin teacher in an episode of Ripping Yarns called Roger of the Raj, which was first shown on BBC television in 1979. He played the part of Osborne in the 1977 episode "Suddenly At Home" in the TV series Rising Damp. He was also in an Only Fools and Horses episode in 1982 ("Diamonds Are for Heather"). Later work included portraying John Biffen in the TV dramatisation of The Alan Clark Diaries (2004). He also played the hotel manager in "Mr. Bean in Room 426" and appeared in A Fish Called Wanda as Archie Leach’s secretary Davidson.

Brierley worked on several occasions with Victoria Wood such as in her play Nearly a Happy Ending, in the early series Wood and Walters and her 1994 TV film Pat and Margaret. In a nod to her previous work with Brierley, Wood named a character after him in her 2006 TV film Housewife, 49.

Personal life
Brierley was a supporter of Manchester United and was a founding member of Shareholders United Against Murdoch.

Death
Brierley died of a heart attack on 23 September 2005.

Selected filmography

Film

Television

References

External links

Red Issue
MUST, the independent Manchester United supporters trust
Obituary in The Guardian
Obituary in The Daily Telegraph

1935 births
2005 deaths
English male television actors
English male voice actors
People from Stockport
Burials at Kensal Green Cemetery